The Naked Runner is a 1967 British espionage film directed by Sidney J. Furie and starring Frank Sinatra, Peter Vaughan and Edward Fox. It was the last film Sinatra made with Warner Bros., and is largely viewed as being a disastrous end to his association with the studio.

Plot
Slattery, a British civil servant, is summoned to meet a minister. The British authorities had arrested a spy, Frenzel, who has now escaped from prison and is being transported overland to Moscow. It is imperative that Frenzel is prevented from passing on what he knows to the Soviet authorities, and Slattery is tasked with locating an assassin.

Unable to use any of his usual contacts, Slattery thinks of Laker, who he worked with during the war. Laker is American, a former spy who now designs office furniture and a widower who lives in London with his young son. Slattery knows that Laker has the necessary skills, but must find a way to persuade him to kill Frenzel.

Laker has planned to visit a trade fair Leipzig with his son, and Slattery persuades him to contact Karen  there. Laker knows her from the war, and there is history between them. After meeting Karen, Laker returns to the trade fair but is taken away at gunpoint to meet Colonel Hartmann of the East German security service. Hartmann tells Laker that he must travel to Copenhagen to carry out an assassination, or that his son will be killed. The target turns out to be Frenzel, and it is clear that Slattery and Hartmann are in cahoots.

Laker flies to Copenhagen and meets Anna, a British agent, who has booked a hotel room overlooking Frenzel's suite. He picks up a sniper's rifle that is to be used in the assassination but, when he returns to the hotel, Anna calls the police and Laker is arrested. Jackson, another British agent, eventually arranges his release and Laker, still carrying a case with the gun inside, goes in search Frenzel. However, Frenzel's plans have been changed and he does not arrive in Copenhagen.

It becomes apparent that the whole Copenhagen episode has been a ruse designed to increase Laker's stress levels, and to make him increasingly desperate. As a final measure he is sent a telegram saying that his son, who in reality is having a nice holiday with Hartmann, has been killed. As Slattery had anticipated, Laker now returns to Leipzig determined to kill the man responsible - Hartmann. He is able to take his rifle on the plane as hand luggage.

Laker contacts Ruth, another British agent, who agrees to help him to kill Hartmann. Slattery gives Ruth details of Frenzel's anticipated movements, pretending they are Hartmann's. The Russians, for reasons best known to themselves, transport Frenzel to the airport along a disused motorway where he is extremely vulnerable to an ambush. The distraught Laker kills Frenzel as planned, and is then driven away by Slattery and Hartmann, who reveal that his son is alive after all..

Cast
 Frank Sinatra as Sam Laker
 Peter Vaughan as Martin Slattery
 Derren Nesbitt as Colonel Hartmann
 Nadia Gray as Karen Gisevius
 Toby Robins as Ruth
 Inger Stratton as Anna
 Cyril Luckham as Cabinet minister
 Edward Fox as Ritchie Jackson
 J.A.B. Dubin-Behrmann as Joseph

Production

Development
Sinatra was in need of a hit—Marriage on the Rocks and Assault on a Queen having flopped in the two previous years—so he put actor and trusted aide Brad Dexter in charge of finding a suitable vehicle. After negotiations for him to star in Harper fell through, The Naked Runner was chosen instead. Sinatra had been impressed with 1965's The IPCRESS File and recruited its director Sidney J. Furie.

Writing
The script by Stanley Mann is based on the 1965 novel by Francis Clifford (a pseudonym of Arthur Leonard Bell Thompson). The title comes from a line in Arthur Symons' In the wood of Finvava—"A naked runner lost in a storm of spears"—that begins the book. The screenplay largely follows the novel but makes the lead character an American based in London.

Casting
Sinatra was paid $1 million. His co-stars included Peter Vaughan, Derren Nesbitt and Edward Fox.

Filming
The film was shot on location in Europe. However, while in Copenhagen, Sinatra left the production to perform at a rally for California's Democratic governor Pat Brown who was running in the 1966 California gubernatorial election against Republican Ronald Reagan. After doing the campaign event, Sinatra decided he was not going to return to Europe. Instead he informed the crew he wanted to finish all his outstanding scenes on a sound stage in Los Angeles.

Dexter and Furie decided to take the maverick action of finishing the film with a stand-in (James Payne) for Sinatra's remaining scenes, editing in close-ups from earlier shots in post-production and overdubbing the dialogue.

Reception
Opening to mostly poor reviews on 19 July 1967, The Naked Runner was criticized for its slow pace, cinematography and plotting. Variety, however, gave Frank Sinatra fair notice, commenting that "Sinatra, whose personal magnetism and acting ability are unquestioned, is shot down by script. Peter Vaughan overacts part as the British agent." However, the reviews of the film weren't enough to keep away audiences who made the film Sinatra's first hit—albeit a minor one—since the massive success of Von Ryan's Express two years earlier. Although the film makes uses of some interesting locations like the post-war ruins of Leipzig and a rare view inside Centre Point, the film has been described as a lifeless depiction of spy-games, with a listless (if stylised) cinematography, that has a heavy-handed plot and very little real characterization..

References

External links
 
 
 
 Variety's Review: https://variety.com/1966/film/reviews/the-naked-runner-1200421251/

1967 films
British spy films
Warner Bros. films
Films directed by Sidney J. Furie
Films scored by Harry Sukman
Films set in Leipzig
Films shot in Copenhagen
Cold War spy films
Films with screenplays by Stanley Mann
Films set in East Germany
1960s English-language films
1960s British films